American Epic: The Best of Blues is a compilation of early blues songs recorded between 1927 and 1936 and released to accompany the American Epic films in 2017. The album was released as a 17-track download and a 13-track vinyl LP. The album was praised by critics as the definitive pre-war blues compilation.

Background 
During the pre-production of the American Epic documentary films, director Bernard MacMahon and producers and co-writers Allison McGourty and Duke Erikson decided to create a series of compilation album releases to expand on the music and performers featured in the documentaries. Contributing to this decision was a new technology in use for transferring and restoring old shellac 78rpm discs for the film's soundtrack. The blues compilation was prepared along with a country compilation, five individual artist compilations and a 5-CD box set, American Epic: The Collection.

Compilation 
The album concentrates on the first electrically recorded blues discs made in North America between 1927 and 1931. It covers a broad range of blues music, from Mississippi Delta artists such as, Charley Patton, Son House and Skip James to Memphis songsters like Frank Stokes and jug bands including the Memphis Jug Band and Cannon's Jug Stompers, Piedmont blues players like Blind Willie McTell and Texas gospel blues evangelist Blind Willie Johnson. The compilation also featured female country blues musicians like Geeshie Wiley and Mattie Delaney who were quite unusual at the time. The album opened with its sole later recording from 1936 - Robert Johnson's "Cross Road Blues" which was itself inspired by the earlier recordings on the set and would become the conduit for later generations into rediscovering these hugely influential late 20s and early 30s blues recordings.

Restoration 
New transfer and sound restoration techniques developed for the American Epic documentary films were utilized to restore the 17 songs on the album. The 78rpm disc transfers were made by audio engineer Nicholas Bergh using 'reverse engineering' techniques garnered from working with the original 1920s recording equipment on The American Epic Sessions along with meticulous sound restoration undertaken by Peter Henderson and Joel Tefteller to reveal greater fidelity, presence and clarity to these 1920s and 1930s recordings than had been heard before. Nicholas Bergh commented "the recordings in this set are special since they utilize the earliest and simplest type of electric recording equipment used for commercial studio work. As a result, they have an unrivaled immediacy to the sound."

The Paramount Records discs presented considerable problems for the audio engineers, as Henderson explained "some of the Charley Patton recordings were very noisy just because they're Paramount Records and they're the hardest to restore," Henderson says. "There'd be so much noise, and that's very difficult to remove manually." Some of the selections were repressed from the original metal parts, which the production located whilst researching the films. Peter Henderson explained "in some cases we were lucky enough to get some metal parts – that's the originals where they were cut to wax and the metal was put into the grooves and the discs were printed from those back in the '20s. Some of those still exist – Sony had some of them in their vaults."

Reception 

The album was acclaimed for its song selection and the quality of the restoration work.

Robert Christgau in Noisey reviewing the 17-track download, awarded the album an A grade and made it his number 2 Best Album of 2017, writing "anyone interested owns somewhat fainter and scratchier versions of tracks on this definitive country blues compilation. But conceptually and song for song, these 17 clear, rich, cannily sequenced Duke Erikson remasters—Delta guys mostly, with hokum bands and two Texans mixed in for extra flavor—leaves them in the dust. Bernard MacMahon defies convention by beginning with an anachronistic culmination—Robert Johnson's mythic "Cross Road Blues" was cut in 1937 (sic), well after country blues's 78-rpm flowering. He blends in the warhorses-in-waiting "'Tain't Nobody's Business," "Walk Right In," and "Sitting on Top of the World." He welcomes Mattie Delaney's polished, still obscure "Tallahatchie River Blues" and Geeshie Wiley's eerie, now canonical "Last Kind Word Blues" into an assertively male canon. And he justifies the ongoing mystification of Blind Willie Johnson's hummed, moaned, postverbal "Dark Was the Night, Cold Was the Ground" by closing with it, as if to prove that, in the end, the message of this music is beyond words." He summarized the album as a "titantic American Epic blues compilation". Randy Lewis in the Los Angeles Times praised the reverse engineering noting "one unforeseen fringe benefit of the reconstruction of the original recording machine: playing records that were made with it decades ago yields unprecedented audio fidelity." Ed Whitelock in PopMatters wrote that "it must be noted that the re-mastering of the American Epic tracks show the benefit both of 25 years of technological improvement and the tireless work of the producers; simply said, the songs sound better here than on any other release I have heard." The audio restoration was described by Greil Marcus in The Village Voice as "re-mastering I can only call profound. Performances you might think you knew sound as if you've never heard them before — never apprehended them." Ian Anderson in fRoots in reviewing the work added "you haven't really heard these tracks at all. Not like this. Forget bad dubs of worn-out 78s pressed on poor vinyl. The 'reverse engineering' transfers by Nicholas Bergh and subsequent restorations are so startlingly better, practically everything you will ever have experienced from this era can be discounted and CD is the best way to hear them. The clarity of group recordings where every instrument is well defined, and of solo artists where their instruments and voices suddenly sound real, will have you on the edge of your seat. And there's none of that fog of 78 surface noise which many people find too much of a distraction: suddenly, legendary artists are in the room with you".

Track listing

Digital download

LP

Personnel 

 Robert Johnson – vocals, guitar (track 1)
 Will Shade – guitar, vocal (track 2)
 Ben Ramey – kazoo (track 2)
 Charlie Burse – guitar, vocals (track 2)
 Jab Jones – jug (track 2)
 Mississippi John Hurt – vocals, guitar (track 3)
 Walter Vinson – guitar, vocals (track 4)
 Lonnie Chatman – violin (track 4)
 Frank Stokes – vocals, guitar (track 5)
 Dan Sane – guitar (track 5)
 Charley Patton – vocals, guitar (track 6)
 Son House – vocals, guitar (track 7)
 Gus Cannon – banjo, jug, vocals (track 8)
 Hosea Woods – guitar, vocal, kazoo (track 8)
 Noah Lewis – harmonica (track 8)
 Booker T. Washington White – vocals, guitar (track 9)
 Geeshie Wiley – vocals, guitar (track 10)
 Garfield Akers – vocals, guitar (track 11)
 Joe Callicott – guitar (track 11)

 Mattie Delaney – vocals, guitar (track 12)
 Blind Willie McTell – vocals, guitar (track 13)
 Willie Brown – vocals, guitar (track 14)
 Tommy Johnson – vocals, guitar (track 15)
 Charlie McCoy – guitar (track 15)
 Skip James – vocals, guitar (track 16)
 Blind Willie Johnson – guitar, vocals (track 17)
 Allison McGourty – compiler, producer
 Bernard MacMahon – editor, producer
 Nicholas Bergh – 78rpm transfers, mastering
 Peter Henderson – restoration, mastering, producer
 Duke Erikson – restoration, mastering, producer
 Joel Tefteller – restoration, mastering
 John Polito – mastering
 Ellis Burman – mastering
 Adam Block – producer
 Patrick Ferris – associate producer
 Jack McLean – associate producer
 Nat Strimpopulos – artwork

References

Footnotes

Bibliography 
 Wald, Elijah & McGourty, Allison & MacMahon, Bernard. American Epic: The First Time America Heard Itself. New York: Touchstone, 2017. .

External links 
 
 Official American Epic website

Folk albums by American artists
2017 compilation albums
Folk compilation albums
Compilation albums by American artists
Blues compilation albums
American Epic albums
Third Man Records compilation albums
Legacy Recordings compilation albums
LO-MAX Records albums